Tehreek-e-Istiqlal was a political party in Pakistan. It was once the second most popular political party in Pakistan. It was formed by Air Marshal Retd. Asghar Khan in 1970.

In 1990 Pakistani general election it entered into an alliance with Pakistan Peoples Party for electoral calculus.

In January 2012, Tehreek-e-Istiqlal announced merging with the Pakistan Tehreek-e-Insaf.

See also
 Politics of Pakistan
 History of Pakistan

References

Political parties in Pakistan
Secularism in Pakistan
Political parties established in 1970
Pakistan Tehreek-e-Insaf